WXRD (103.9 FM) is a radio station broadcasting a classic rock format using the station name X-Rock 103.9.  Licensed to Crown Point, Indiana, United States, it serves Northwest Indiana and Chicago's south suburbs.  The station is currently owned by Adams Radio Group, LLC, through licensee Adams Radio of Northern Indiana, LLC.  The station also features national and local newscasts.

History
The station began broadcasting November 10, 1972, holding the call sign WFLM, and airing an easy listening format, as the "World's Finest Listening Music". The station was originally owned by John Meyer. In 1982, the station's call sign was changed to WWJY, and the station was branded "Joy"/"South Lake 104". In 1993, John Meyer sold the station to M & M Broadcasting, owned by former Hammond, Indiana mayor Thomas McDermott, Sr., for $600,000. On March 1, 1993, the station's format was changed from easy listening to CHR. In 1995, the station began to simulcast the rock format of WABT 103.9 in Dundee, Illinois.

In 1996, the station was sold to Z-Spanish Network, along with WABT, for $3.6 million, and the station adopted a Spanish language format, as "La Zeta". On July 1, 1996, the station's call sign was changed to WZCO. The station would go silent shortly thereafter, before switching to a country music format in November 1996, with programming from Real Country, under a LMA with M & M Broadcasting, who was in the process of purchasing the station. On December 2, 1996, the station's call sign was changed to WXRD. By 2002, the station's format had been changed to classic rock. In 2004, the station was sold to Radio One Communications, along with WZVN, for $4.9 million. The station was purchased by Adams Radio Group in 2014.

After 18 years, WXRD pulled "The Bob and Tom Show" off the air on June 17, 2019 and began a locally-produced classic rock morning show.  As of December, 2021, Nights with Alice Cooper was the station's only syndicated day-part.

References

External links

XRD
Mass media in Lake County, Indiana
Classic rock radio stations in the United States
Radio stations established in 1972
1972 establishments in Indiana